Tillicum Beach is a hamlet in central Alberta, Canada within Camrose County. It is located along Dried Meat Lake.

Demographics 

See also 
List of communities in Alberta
List of hamlets in Alberta

References 

Camrose County
Designated places in Alberta
Hamlets in Alberta